Riffle is an unincorporated community in Braxton County, West Virginia, United States.

History
The community was named after Jacob Riffle, a Civil War veteran.

Notable person
Gray Barker, writer, was born in Riffle.

References

Unincorporated communities in Braxton County, West Virginia
Unincorporated communities in West Virginia